The Microscopy Society of America (MSA) was founded in 1942 as The Electron Microscope Society of America and is a non-profit organization that provides microanalytical facilities for studies within the sciences. Currently, there are approximately 3000 members. The society holds an annual meeting, which is usually held in the beginning of August. It has 30 local affiliates across the United States. The society has a program for examining and certifying technologists of electron microscopes. The organization produces two journals: Microscopy Today, and Microscopy and Microanalysis. As of 2022, the President is Deborah F. Kelly.

Microscopy Listserver
   
The Microscopy Listserver  is a network based discussion forum giving members of the scientific community a centralized Internet address to which questions/comments/answers in the various fields of Microscopy or Microanalysis can be rapidly distributed to a list of (subscribed) individuals by electronic mail. There are in excess of 3000 subscribers to the Microscopy Listserver from over 40 countries on 6 continents, who participate in this system on a daily basis. Messages are posted and circulated daily on a variety of topics. The Listserver was founded  by  Nestor J. Zaluzec who continues to host and operate the service for the scientific community, the Listserver is co-sponsored in part by the Microscopy Society of America.

This Listserver has been in operation since 1993 and maintains a searchable archive of all posted Email questions, comments, and responses.  Every two months, selected contributions on the Microscopy Listserver are published in the archives of Microscopy-Today 

For the purposes of this forum, Microscopy or Microanalysis is considered to include all techniques which employ a probe such as: photons (including x-rays), electrons, ions, mechanical and/or electromagnetic radiation to form a representation or characterization of the microstructure (internal or external) of any material in either physical and/or life sciences applications.

Some of the more common techniques which are associated with this field include the following: 
 optical microscopy
 x-ray microscopy
 scanning electron microscopy
 transmission electron microscopy
 atomic force microscopy
 scanning tunneling microscopy
 scanning ion microscopy
 analytical electron microscopy
 high resolution electron microscopy*
 intermediate/high voltage electron microscopy
 electron microprobe analyzers
 x-ray  energy dispersive spectroscopy
 electron energy loss spectroscopy
  .......

There are no charges  for usage of the forum, except for the request that one actively participates in any discussion to which you have a question, comment and/or contribution.

Unsolicited commercial advertising messages are prohibited, however, brief announcements of educational/training courses are permitted on a strictly limited basis.

In compliance with US Public Law 108-187 (CANSPAM Act) only subscribers and/or posters receive copies of posting to the Listserver via Email. Non-subscribers are allowed to browse the archives.

References

External links
Official website

Microscopy organizations
Organizations established in 1942
Scientific societies based in the United States
1942 establishments in the United States